The 1960 Six Hour Le Mans was a motor race for sports cars and sedans.
The event was held at the Caversham Airfield circuit in Western Australia on 6 June 1960. 
It was the sixth annual Six Hour Le Mans race.

The race was won by Jack Ayers and Lionel Beattie driving a Holden Sports.

Results

Notes
 Attendance: 6,000
 Start: Le Mans-style

References

External links
 Morgan / BRM Morgan / Repco Holden Sports, www.terrywalkersplace.com, as archived at web.archive.org

Six Hours Le Mans
Six Hour Le Mans
June 1960 sports events in Australia